Paratriacanthodes retrospinis is a marine bathydemersal fish species in the spikefish family.

Description
The species has a short snout, pointed at the upper end, large eyes projecting outward, and relatively short gill openings. It usually is brightly orange colored on the upper half and of paler color on the lower half of the body.

Distribution and habitat
P. retrospinis is widely distributed in the Indo-West Pacific from South and East Africa to southern Japan and New Caledonia. It has been reported from depths of 418 - 920 m.

References

Tetraodontiformes